Noel James Abernethy (4 November 1902 – 1 October 1974) was an Australian rules footballer who played as a half-back flanker who played for the Melbourne Football Club after being schooled at Wesley College. He played 130 games for Melbourne between 1923–24 and 1926–32. He kicked 61 goals.

Abernethy was originally from Shepparton and attended boarding school at Wesley. Abernethy had a successful junior career for Wesley, being the champion player of the Associated Public Schools of Victoria. As such he attracted interest from many VFL clubs. Because he had been living in St Kilda, the St Kilda claimed that Abernethy was in their zone. The Demons, however, argued that he technically still lived with his parents in Shepparton. The VFL committee ended up siding with Melbourne's point of view and the Demons signed Abernethy.

Abernethy played for Melbourne in 1923 and 1924, but moved back to Shepparton in 1925, to further his law career. Abernethy was captain the Shepparton Football Club when they won the 1925 Goulburn Valley Football Netball League premiership.

Abernethy came back to play for Melbourne the next season and was a part of their premiership team. He continued to play for the Demons until his retirement from VFL football in 1932.

Abernethy was made a life member of the Melbourne Football Club in 1961. In 2008, to celebrate the 150th anniversary of the Melbourne Football Club's founding, the Demons named their "150 greatest heroes", of which Abernethy was one.

References

External links

 
Demonwiki profile

Australian rules footballers from Victoria (Australia)
Melbourne Football Club players
1902 births
1974 deaths
People educated at Wesley College (Victoria)
Shepparton Football Club players
Melbourne Football Club Premiership players
One-time VFL/AFL Premiership players